Jeon Chae-eun (Korean: 전채은; born October 15, 2005) is a South Korean actress. She first gained recognition through the 2021 television series The Devil Judge.

Career
Jeon Chae-eun began to have an interest in acting when she was in elementary school, after she was cast as the protagonist Anne in the musical theatre Anne of Green Gables produced by a local troupe. She debuted with the 2020 indie film Stone Skipping, as a runaway girl living in shelter.

Jeon gained her first recognition from her television series debut role, as the protagonist's disabled but genius teenage niece in the 2021 tvN's legal thriller The Devil Judge.

In 2022 Jeon has been cast in two series, KBS2's human melodrama If You Wish Upon Me as the only high school volunteer at a hospice and tvN's family mystery Little Women as the daughter of a prestigious family.

Filmography

Film

Television series

Musical theatre

References

External links 
 at Saram Entertainment
 

2005 births
Living people
South Korean television actresses
South Korean film actresses
21st-century South Korean actresses
People from Namyangju